Palpita crococosta is a moth in the family Crambidae. It was described by Inoue in 1997. It is found in Papua New Guinea (Bougainville Island).

References

Moths described in 1997
Palpita
Moths of New Guinea